Verliebt in Berlin (German pun for In Love in/with Berlin; abbreviation: ViB) is a Golden Rose-winning German telenovela, starring Alexandra Neldel, along with Mathis Künzler, Tim Sander, and Laura Osswald. It premiered on 28 February 2005 on Sat.1 in most of German-speaking Europe, with its final episode broadcast on 12 October 2007. The series is an adaptation of the Colombian telenovela Yo soy Betty, la fea, written by Fernando Gaitán and produced by RCN TV.

The original season of the serial comedy-drama followed the life of the unsophisticated but good-natured Lisa Plenske (Neldel), and her incongruous job at the ultra-chic Berlin fashion house Kerima Moda; while the second season revolved around Lisa's ham-fisted but sly half-brother Bruno (Sander) and junior designer Hannah Refrath (Osswald). Lisa and Bruno's status as two "fish out of water" drove much of the story plot.

ViB was adapted into a Berlin setting by creators Michael Esser, Peter Schlesselmann and their co-team and co-producers Markus Brunnemann and Rainer Wemcken, whose production company Phoenix Film Karlheinz Brunnemann GmbH & Co. Produktions KG partnered with Grundy UFA TV Produktions GmbH to create the half-hour-long program for the German-speaking audience.

Plot

Original season 

The plot is set in the present time. Elisabeth "Lisa" Plenske (Alexandra Neldel), a kind, intelligent, but naive and not necessarily beautiful young woman, grows up in the (fictional) village Göberitz, near Berlin, with her parents Bernd (Volker Herold) and Helga (Ulrike Mai). Lisa moves to Berlin and tries to get a job at Kerima Moda, a fashion company. There, she bumps into the junior chairman David Seidel (Mathis Künzler) and falls in love with him. She starts off catering at Kerima Moda, but manages to get promoted to personal assistant of Seidel. She works with him, however he does not really notice her qualities (much less herself as a woman), because he is engaged to Mariella von Brahmberg (Bianca Hein) and is also involved with various other women.

During the course of the series, Lisa manages to save and finally own Kerima Moda, rescues her boss David from death and the wrath of his then-fiancée, watches him break off his engagement to Mariella, protects the company from David's maleficent rival and stepbrother and Mariella's brother Richard von Brahmberg (Karim Köster) and his mother Sophie von Brahmberg (Gabrielle Scharnitzky), endures the antics of the secretary Sabrina (Nina Gnädig), falls in love with and gets engaged to Robert "Rokko" Kowalski (Manuel Cortez), while bearing the quirks of the chief designer Hugo Haas (Hubertus Regout) and helping his assistant Hannah Refrath (Laura Osswald), David's sister Kim (Lara-Isabelle Rentinck) and the runner boy Timo (Matthias Dietrich) with their love lives.

She is aided by her best friend Jürgen Decker (Oliver Bokern) and the cook Agnes Hetzer (Susanne Szell). In the end, she calls off the wedding to Rokko, marries David instead and sails with him on his boat to the Caribbean.

Second season 
Season two centers around sympathetic conman Bruno Lehmann (Tim Sander), who is Lisa's half-brother. Bruno is on the run and lands up in Berlin to see his (unassuming) father Bernd. There, he starts to save the lifework of his half-sister Lisa, and Bruno starts to realize that his charm won't get him anywhere and that sometimes you have to work for your achievements. Also, he starts to fall in love with the young (and married) designer Nora Lindberg (Julia Malik). Because of bad ratings, Sat1 replaced Julia Malik. So Bruno is now fallen in love with Kim who is the younger sister of David Seidel and married to the evil Paolo Amendola .
Since January 2007 Bruno Lehmann isn't the main character, who is in love with somebody, anymore. Instead it's the returned designer Hannah Refrath who is in love with him …

Background

Production 
The concept for the German adaptation of Yo Soy Betty La Fea was the end result of a long consideration process. The original name of the telenovela was Alles nur aus Liebe (Everything just out of love), but the for soap operas typical abbreviation would have been ANAL, so the title was changed. Lisa also was called "Lily" in earlier versions.

Most Verliebt in Berlin episodes were shot in two closed studios in Berlin-Adlershof. While switching between a range of 24 different sets, the team generally filmed one episode (each 25 minutes) per day; in addition, outdoor shots in Berlin were booked twice a week. Supervised by creators Michael Esser, and Peter Schlesselmann, 15 writers daily drafted a script for one episode. Nearly 120 crewmembers were involved in the shooting of a single episode.

Originally, 225 episodes would have been produced and aired within a year. However, since the telenovela was very successful, Sat.1 produced the series for another year. On September 1, 2006, a 90-minute TV movie was aired - hence being the final episode of the first season (with ratings of more than 7.6 million people watching — very much for the German market). Two versions of this movie exist: one, where Lisa marries David (the canonical version which was chosen in the end) and the other, where she marries Rokko.

In June 2006, Grundy UFA and Sat.1 officially announced the renewal of a new season for another year. Till August 2007, 280 more episodes were to be produced with Bruno Lehman as new protagonist. With the combination of renewal and change of protagonist, the series left the traditional set-up of a telenovela with a set run, and a closed story and moved towards the concept of a soap opera. The reason for this is possibly the huge success of the series: it managed to get similar high viewership like Gute Zeiten, schlechte Zeiten, the soap opera which had previously dominated viewership just before primetime. In January 2007 it was announced that Alexandra Neldel would reprise the role of Lisa Plenske Seidel during a four-week visit to Verliebt in Berlin in April.

Merchandising 
Additional information about the telenovela is available via a fan magazine (available in Germany, Switzerland and Austria), as well as a PC video game adventure. Also, DVD boxes are available (20 episodes each), including the specials. The 18th box set includes the last twenty episodes and the TV movie. On October 6, 2006 the alternate ending of the TV movie was released. The show also spawned a series of novels and a soundtrack CD containing music from the series, including the show's theme song by Nena, plus songs from Dido, Glashaus, Sarah Connor, Norah Jones, Sarah McLachlan, Joss Stone, and others.

Miscellaneous 
Since January 2006, the Hungarian TV station TV2 is airing a dubbed version of ViB called Lisa csak egy van (There's only one Lisa). Also, the French TV station TF1, the Belgian RTL-TVI and the Télévision Suisse Romande air a dubbed version called Le destin de Lisa (The destiny of Lisa). In Slovakia, the series is aired with its original title Verliebt in Berlin on TV JOJ.

The series was originally planned to be titled "Alles Nur Aus Liebe" (Everything Out Of Love), but the producers decided to change the name once realising that the acronym for this title would be inappropriate.

Awards and nominations 
 2005: Deutscher Fernsehpreis (German TV Award) for Best Daily Series
 2006: Rose d'Or
 Best Soap
 Best Actress in a Soap — Alexandra Neldel

Cast

Main actors

Minor actors

References

External links 
 Official website of Verliebt in Berlin (German)
 

2005 telenovelas
2006 telenovelas
2007 telenovelas
2005 German television series debuts
2007 German television series endings
Yo soy Betty, la fea
Television series by Fremantle (company)
German telenovelas
Television shows set in Berlin
German-language television shows
Sat.1 telenovelas